Thomas Cobbold (April, 1680, Rattlesden – 1752) was an English brewer who established a family brewery in Ipswich. The Cobbold family went on to become one of the most influential families in Ipswich.

He was the son of John Cobbold (1654 – 1736) and Mary Parker (1650 – 1693). He set up as a maltster in Bury St Edmunds. However in 1723 he established a brewery in King's Quay Street, Harwich. But the water in Harwich was found to be brackish. As Thomas owned some land near Holywells, near Ipswich, he started shipping the water from there to Harwich for use in his brewing business.

Further reading
 The Gifts of Frank Cobbold by Arthur W. Upfield, Cobbold Family Trust (2008)

References

1680 births
1752 deaths
English brewers